The men's C-2 500 metres event was an open-style, pairs canoeing event conducted as part of the Canoeing at the 1992 Summer Olympics program.

Medalists

Results

Heats
15 teams entered in two heats. The top two finishers from each of the heats advanced directly to the final while the remaining teams were relegated to the semifinals.

Semifinals
Two semifinals were held. The top two finishers from each semifinal and the fastest third-place finisher advanced to the final.

Final
The final was held on August 7.

References
1992 Summer Olympics official report Volume 5. pp. 143–4. 
Sports-reference.com 1992 C-2 500 m results.
Wallechinsky, David and Jaime Loucky (2008). "Canoeing: Men's Canadian Doubles 500 Meters". In The Complete Book of the Olympics: 2008 Edition. London: Aurum Press Limited. p. 482.

Men's C-2 500
Men's events at the 1992 Summer Olympics